Acronicta beameri is a moth of the family Noctuidae. It is found from Texas to Arizona.

The wingspan is 37–43 mm.

External links
Bug Guide

Acronicta
Moths of North America
Moths described in 1958